The 2010 San Francisco Giants season marked their 128th year in Major League Baseball, their 53rd year in San Francisco since their move from New York following the 1957 season, and their 11th in AT&T Park. The Giants won the National League West for the first time since the 2003 season and both the National League Division Series and National League Championship Series for the first time since the 2002 season. They would go on to win the World Series, their first championship since moving to San Francisco in 1958. Giants catcher Buster Posey was awarded the National League Rookie of the Year Award.

On October 7, the Giants played their first playoff game since 2003. In the first game of their National League Division Series against the Atlanta Braves, Tim Lincecum struck out fourteen in a 1–0 victory over Derek Lowe, setting a franchise postseason strikeout record. On October 11, the Giants won their series against Atlanta, advancing to the National League Championship Series against the Philadelphia Phillies. On October 23, the Giants defeated the Phillies to advance to the World Series where they faced the Texas Rangers. On November 1, the Giants defeated the Rangers in Game 5 to win their first championship since .

Notable events
 December 29, 2009 — Giants sign free agent Mark DeRosa
 January 13 — Giants sign free agent Aubrey Huff
 April 15 — Giants trade outfielder Fred Lewis to the Toronto Blue Jays for a player to be named later or cash considerations
 May 29 — Giants promote catcher Buster Posey from AAA-Fresno and sign free agent outfielder Pat Burrell
 June 30 — Giants trade catcher Bengie Molina to the Texas Rangers for relief pitcher Chris Ray and a player to be named later
 July 4 — Pitchers Tim Lincecum and Brian Wilson are named to the 2010 Major League Baseball All-Star Game
 July 15 — Giants sign free agent Dontrelle Willis to a minor league deal
 July 31 — Giants trade pitcher Joe Martinez and minor-league outfielder John Bowker to the Pittsburgh Pirates for left-handed relief pitcher Javier López
 July 31 — Giants trade minor league pitcher Daniel Turpen to the Boston Red Sox in exchange for right-handed relief pitcher Ramón Ramírez
August 11 — Giants trade minor league outfielder Evan Crawford to the Chicago Cubs for infielder Mike Fontenot
 August 13 — Giants acquire outfielder José Guillén from the Kansas City Royals for a player to be named later and cash
 August 23 — Giants claim outfielder Cody Ross off of waivers from the Florida Marlins
 October 23 — Giants defeat Philadelphia 3–2, winning the NLCS 4–2 and advancing to face the Texas Rangers in the 2010 World Series
 November 3 — The Giants and their fans celebrate the World Series victory with a parade from the Financial District to Civic Center in downtown San Francisco.
 November 15 — Buster Posey is named the National League Rookie of the Year

Offseason and spring training
The Giants 23–12 record was good enough for second place in the Cactus League standings and was the best spring training record among National League teams.

Season standings

National League West

Record vs. opponents

Game log

Regular season

|-  style="text-align:center; background:#bfb;"
| 1 || April 5 || @ Astros || 5–2 || Lincecum (1–0) || Oswalt (0–1) || Wilson (1) || 43,836 || 1–0
|-  style="text-align:center; background:#bfb;"
| 2 || April 6 || @ Astros || 3–0 || Zito (1–0) || Rodríguez (0–1) || Wilson (2) || 24,237 || 2–0
|-  style="text-align:center; background:#bfb;"
| 3 || April 7 || @ Astros || 10–4 || Affeldt (1–0) || Gervacio (0–1) || || 21,599 || 3–0
|-  style="text-align:center; background:#bfb;"
| 4 || April 9 || Braves || 5–4 (13) || Affeldt (2–0) || Medlen (0–1) || || 42,940 || 4–0
|-  style="text-align:center; background:#fbb;"
| 5 || April 10 || Braves || 7–2 || Lowe (1–0) || Wellemeyer (0–1) || || 42,985 || 4–1
|-  style="text-align:center; background:#bfb;"
| 6 || April 11 || Braves || 6–3 || Lincecum (2–0) || Kawakami (0–1) || Affeldt (1) || 38,062 || 5–1
|-  style="text-align:center; background:#bfb;"
| 7 || April 12 || Pirates || 9–3 || Zito (2–0) || Burres (0–1) || || 26,011 || 6–1
|-  style="text-align:center; background:#fbb;"
| 8 || April 13 || Pirates || 6–5 || Meek (1–0) || Affeldt (2–1) || Dotel (2) || 28,030 || 6–2
|-  style="text-align:center; background:#bfb;"
| 9 || April 14 || Pirates || 6–0 || Sánchez (1–0) || Morton (0–2) || || 29,028 || 7–2
|-  style="text-align:center; background:#fbb;"
| 10 || April 16 || @ Dodgers || 10–8 || Padilla (1–1) || Wellemeyer (0–2) || || 49,319 || 7–3
|-  style="text-align:center; background:#bfb;"
| 11 || April 17 || @ Dodgers || 9–0 || Lincecum (3–0) || Haeger (0–1) || || 44,734 || 8–3
|-  style="text-align:center; background:#fbb;"
| 12 || April 18 || @ Dodgers || 2–1 || Troncoso (1–0) || Romo (0–1) || Broxton (1) || 50,433 || 8–4
|-  style="text-align:center; background:#fbb;"
| 13 || April 19 || @ Padres || 3–2 || Stauffer (2–0) || Affeldt (2–2) || || 17,087 || 8–5
|-  style="text-align:center; background:#fbb;"
| 14 || April 20 || @ Padres || 1–0 || Latos (1–1) || Sánchez (1–1) || Bell (4) || 17,822 || 8–6
|-  style="text-align:center; background:#fbb;"
| 15 || April 21 || @ Padres || 5–2 || Garland (1–2) || Wellemeyer (0–3) || || 14,906 || 8–7
|-  style="text-align:center; background:#bfb;"
| 16 || April 23 || Cardinals || 4–1 || Lincecum (4–0) || García (1–1) || Wilson (3) || 42,860 || 9–7
|-  style="text-align:center; background:#bfb;"
| 17 || April 24 || Cardinals || 2–0 || Zito (3–0) || Wainwright (3–1) || Wilson (4) || 41,785 || 10–7
|-  style="text-align:center; background:#fbb;"
| 18 || April 25 || Cardinals || 2–0 || Penny (3–0) || Cain (0–1) || Franklin (6) || 40,230 || 10–8
|-  style="text-align:center; background:#bfb;"
| 19 || April 26 || Phillies || 5–1 || Sánchez (2–1) || Halladay (4–1) || || 30,035 || 11–8
|-  style="text-align:center; background:#bfb;"
| 20 || April 27 || Phillies || 6–2 || Wellemeyer (1–3) || Moyer (2–2) || || 31,792 || 12–8
|-  style="text-align:center; background:#fbb;"
| 21 || April 28 || Phillies || 7–6 (11) || Madson (1–0) || Romo (0–2) || Figueroa (1) || 32,369 || 12–9
|-  style="text-align:center; background:#bfb;"
| 22 || April 30 || Rockies || 5–2 || Zito (4–0) || Cook (1–3) || Affeldt (2) || 37,144 || 13–9
|-

|-  style="text-align:center; background:#bfb;"
| 23 || May 1 || Rockies || 6–1 || Cain (1–1) || Rogers (0–1) || || 39,211 || 14–9
|-  style="text-align:center; background:#fbb;"
| 24 || May 2 || Rockies || 4–1 || Chacín (1–0) || Sánchez (2–2) || || 41,831 || 14–10
|-  style="text-align:center; background:#bfb;"
| 25 || May 4 || @ Marlins || 9–6 (12) || Runzler (1–0) || Badenhop (0–3) || Mota (1) || 13,690 || 15–10
|-  style="text-align:center; background:#bfb;"
| 26 || May 5 || @ Marlins || 3–2 || Zito (5–0) || Robertson (2–3) || Wilson (5) || 11,633 || 16–10
|-  style="text-align:center; background:#bfb;"
| 27 || May 6 || @ Marlins || 6–3 ||Cain (2–1) || Nolasco (2–2) || Wilson (6) || 12,804 || 17–10
|-  style="text-align:center; background:#fbb;"
| 28 || May 7 || @ Mets || 6–4 || Rodríguez (2–0) || Romo (0–3) || || 34,681 || 17–11
|-  style="text-align:center; background:#fbb;"
| 29 || May 8 || @ Mets || 5–4 (11) || Takahashi (3–1) || Mota (0–1) || || 36,764 || 17–12
|-  style="text-align:center; background:#bfb;"
| 30 || May 9 || @ Mets || 6–5 || Romo (1–3) || Mejía (0–2) || Wilson (7) || 35,641 || 18–12
|-  style="text-align:center; background:#fbb;"
| 31 || May 11 || Padres || 3–2 || Webb (1–1) || Zito (5–1) || Bell (9) || 33,249 || 18–13
|-  style="text-align:center; background:#fbb;"
| 32 || May 12 || Padres || 5–2 || Richard (2–2) || Cain (2–2) || Bell (10) || 30,924 || 18–14
|-  style="text-align:center; background:#fbb;"
| 33 || May 13 || Padres || 1–0 || Latos (3–3) || Sánchez (2–3) || || 32,861 || 18–15
|-  style="text-align:center; background:#bfb;"
| 34 || May 14 || Astros || 8–2 || Wellemeyer (2–3) || Paulino (0–6) || || 38,650 || 19–15
|-  style="text-align:center; background:#bfb;"
| 35 || May 15 || Astros || 2–1 || Lincecum (5–0) || Oswalt (2–5) || Wilson (8) || 40,060 || 20–15
|-  style="text-align:center; background:#bfb;"
| 36 || May 16 || Astros || 4–3 || Zito (6–1) || Myers (2–3) || Wilson (9) || 40,582 || 21–15
|-  style="text-align:center; background:#fbb;"
| 37 || May 17 || @ Padres || 3–1 || Richard (3–2) || Cain (2–3) || Bell (11) || 20,558 || 21–16
|-  style="text-align:center; background:#bfb;"
| 38 || May 18 || @ Padres || 7–6 (12) || Runzler (2–0) || Ramos (0–1) || Wilson (10) || 19,565 || 22–16
|-  style="text-align:center; background:#fbb;"
| 39 || May 19 || @ Diamondbacks || 13–1 || Kennedy (3–2) || Wellemeyer (2–4) || || 17,073 || 22–17
|-  style="text-align:center; background:#fbb;"
| 40 || May 20 || @ Diamondbacks || 8–7 || Heilman (1–1) || Affeldt (2–3) || Qualls (7) || 18,607 || 22–18
|-  style="text-align:center; background:#fbb;"
| 41 || May 21 || @ Athletics || 6–1 || Cahill (2–2) || Zito (6–2) || || 33,369 || 22–19
|-  style="text-align:center; background:#fbb;"
| 42 || May 22 || @ Athletics || 1–0 || Gonzalez (5–3) || Cain (2–4) || Bailey (7) || 35,067 || 22–20
|-  style="text-align:center; background:#fbb;"
| 43 || May 23 || @ Athletics || 3–0 || Wuertz (1–0) || Sánchez (2–4) || Bailey (8) || 35,067 || 22–21
|-  style="text-align:center; background:#bfb;"
| 44 || May 25 || Nationals || 4–2 || Wellemeyer (3–4) || Hernández (4–3) || Wilson (11) || 27,981 || 23–21
|-  style="text-align:center; background:#fbb;"
| 45 || May 26 || Nationals || 7–3 || Atilano (4–1) || Lincecum (5–1) || || 30,230 || 23–22
|-  style="text-align:center; background:#bfb;"
| 46 || May 27 || Nationals || 5–4 || Casilla (1–0) || Burnett (0–2) || Wilson (12) || 28,251 || 24–22
|-  style="text-align:center; background:#bfb;"
| 47 || May 28 || Diamondbacks  || 5–0 || Cain (3–4) || Jackson (3–6) || || 31,495 || 25–22
|-  style="text-align:center; background:#bfb;"
| 48 || May 29 || Diamondbacks || 12–1 || Sánchez (3–4) || Buckner (0–3) || || 37,400 || 26–22
|-  style="text-align:center; background:#bfb;"
| 49 || May 30 || Diamondbacks || 6–5 (10) || Wilson (1–0) || Rosa (0–1) || || 41,394 || 27–22
|-  style="text-align:center; background:#fbb;"
| 50 || May 31 || Rockies || 4–0 || Jiménez (10–1) || Lincecum (5–2) || || 42,465 || 27–23
|-

|-  style="text-align:center; background:#fbb;"
| 51 || June 1 || Rockies || 2–1 (11) || Betancourt (1–1) || Casilla (1–1) || Corpas (5) || 31,198 || 27–24
|-  style="text-align:center; background:#bfb;"
| 52 || June 2 || Rockies || 4–1 || Cain (4–4) || Francis (1–2) || Wilson (13) || 30,697 || 28–24
|-  style="text-align:center; background:#bfb;"
| 53 || June 4 || @ Pirates || 6–4 || Sánchez (4–4) || Duke (3–6) || Wilson (14) || 17,817 || 29–24
|-  style="text-align:center; background:#fbb;"
| 54 || June 5 || @ Pirates || 6–3 || Maholm (4–4) || Wellemeyer (3–5) || || 36,687 || 29–25
|-  style="text-align:center; background:#bfb;"
| 55 || June 6 || @ Pirates || 6–5 (10) || Wilson (2–0) || Dotel (2–1) || Casilla (1) || 24,068 || 30–25
|-  style="text-align:center; background:#bfb;"
| 56 || June 7 || @ Reds || 6–5 || Romo (2–3) || Herrera (0–3) || Wilson (15) || 18,457 || 31–25
|-  style="text-align:center; background:#bfb;"
| 57 || June 8 || @ Reds || 3–0 || Cain (5–4) || LeCure (1–2) || || 13,011 || 32–25
|-  style="text-align:center; background:#fbb;"
| 58 || June 9 || @ Reds || 6–3 || Harang (5–5) || Sánchez (4–5) || || 14,700 || 32–26
|-  style="text-align:center; background:#fbb;"
| 59 || June 10 || @ Reds || 6–5 || Rhodes (2–1) || Mota (0–2) || Cordero (17) || 19,241 || 32–27
|-  style="text-align:center; background:#bfb;"
| 60 || June 11 || Athletics || 6–2 || Lincecum (6–2) || Gonzalez (6–4) || Wilson (16) || 41,817 || 33–27
|-  style="text-align:center; background:#bfb;"
| 61 || June 12 || Athletics || 5–4 || Zito (7–2) || Sheets (2–6) || Wilson (17) || 36,861 || 34–27
|-  style="text-align:center; background:#bfb;"
| 62 || June 13 || Athletics || 6–2 || Cain (6–4) || Mazzaro (2–1) || Casilla (2) || 39,187 || 35–27
|-  style="text-align:center; background:#bfb;"
| 63 || June 14 || Orioles || 10–2 || Sánchez (5–5) || Tillman (0–3) || || 33,822 || 36–27
|-  style="text-align:center; background:#fbb;"
| 64 || June 15 || Orioles || 4–1 || Arrieta (2–0) || Martinez (0–1) || Hernandez (2) || 35,498 || 36–28
|-  style="text-align:center; background:#bfb;"
| 65 || June 16 || Orioles || 6–3 || Lincecum (7–2) || Guthrie (3–8) || Wilson (18) || 38,485 || 37–28
|-  style="text-align:center; background:#fbb;"
| 66 || June 18 || @ Blue Jays || 3–2 || Downs (2–5) || Zito (7–3) || Gregg (17) || 18,667 || 37–29
|-  style="text-align:center; background:#fbb;"
| 67 || June 19 || @ Blue Jays || 3–0 || Camp (2–1) || Cain (6–5) || Gregg (18) || 20,666 || 37–30
|-  style="text-align:center; background:#bfb;"
| 68 || June 20 || @ Blue Jays || 9–6 || Bautista (1–0) || Tallet (1–3) || Wilson (19) || 21,431 || 38–30
|-  style="text-align:center; background:#bfb;"
| 69 || June 22 || @ Astros || 3–1 || Lincecum (8–2) || Oswalt (5–9) || Wilson (20) || 29,777 || 39–30
|-  style="text-align:center; background:#fbb;"
| 70 || June 23 || @ Astros || 6–3 || Myers (5–5) || Zito (7–4) || Lindstrom (16) || 29,311 || 39–31
|-  style="text-align:center; background:#fbb;"
| 71 || June 24 || @ Astros || 7–5 || Rodríguez (4–10) || Cain (6–6) || Lindstrom (17) || 26,662 || 39–32
|-  style="text-align:center; background:#bfb;"
| 72 || June 25 || Red Sox || 5–4 || Sánchez (6–5) || Wakefield (2–6) || Wilson (21) || 41,182 || 40–32
|-  style="text-align:center; background:#fbb;"
| 73 || June 26 || Red Sox || 4–2 || Atchison (1–1) || Bumgarner (0–1) || Papelbon (17) || 42,178 || 40–33
|-  style="text-align:center; background:#fbb;"
| 74 || June 27 || Red Sox || 5–1 || Lester (9–3) || Lincecum (8–3) || || 41,528 || 40–34
|-  style="text-align:center; background:#fbb;"
| 75 || June 28 || Dodgers || 4–2 || Weaver (5–1) || Casilla (1–2) || Kuo (2) || 34,626 || 40–35
|-  style="text-align:center; background:#fbb;"
| 76 || June 29 || Dodgers || 4–2 || Ely (4–5) || Cain (6–7) || Belisario (1) || 35,289 || 40–36
|-  style="text-align:center; background:#fbb;"
| 77 || June 30 || Dodgers || 8–2 || Padilla (2–2) || Sánchez (6–6) || || 39,962 || 40–37
|-

|-  style="text-align:center; background:#fbb;"
| 78 || July 1 || @ Rockies || 7–3 || Cook (3–5) || Bumgarner (0–2) || || 32,134 || 40–38
|-  style="text-align:center; background:#fbb;"
| 79 || July 2 || @ Rockies || 6–3 || Chacín (5–7) || Lincecum (8–4) || Street (2) || 48,127 || 40–39
|-  style="text-align:center; background:#bfb;"
| 80 || July 3 || @ Rockies || 11–8 || Bautista (2–0)  || Corpas (2–5) || Wilson (22) || 49,271 || 41–39
|-  style="text-align:center; background:#fbb;"
| 81 || July 4 || @ Rockies || 4–3  (15) || Flores (2–0) || Mota (0–3) || || 35,274 || 41–40
|-  style="text-align:center; background:#bfb;"
| 82 || July 5 || @ Brewers || 6–1 || Sánchez (7–6) || Loe (0–1) || || 36,185 || 42–40
|-  style="text-align:center; background:#bfb;"
| 83 || July 6 || @ Brewers || 6–1 || Bumgarner (1–2) || Wolf (6–8) || || 30,896 || 43–40
|-  style="text-align:center; background:#bfb;"
| 84 || July 7 || @ Brewers || 15–2 || Lincecum (9–4) || Narveson (7–6) || || 29,387 || 44–40
|-  style="text-align:center; background:#bfb;"
| 85 || July 8 || @ Brewers || 9–3 || Runzler (3–0) || Parra (3–6) || || 34,590 || 45–40
|-  style="text-align:center; background:#fbb;"
| 86 || July 9 || @ Nationals || 8–1 || Strasburg (3–2) || Cain (6–8) || || 34,723 || 45–41
|-  style="text-align:center; background:#bfb;"
| 87 || July 10 || @ Nationals || 10–5 || Casilla (2–2) || Clippard (8–6) || || 23,977 || 46–41
|-  style="text-align:center; background:#bfb;"
| 88 || July 11 || @ Nationals || 6–2 || Bumgarner (2–2) || Hernández (6–5) || Wilson (23) || 22,403 || 47–41
|-  style="text-align:center; background:#bfb;"
| 89 || July 15 || Mets || 2–0 || Lincecum (10–4) || Dickey (6–3) || || 38,416 || 48–41
|-  style="text-align:center; background:#bfb;"
| 90 || July 16 || Mets || 1–0 || Zito (8–4) || Niese (6–4) || Wilson (24) || 41,869 || 49–41
|-  style="text-align:center; background:#bfb;"
| 91 || July 17 || Mets || 8–4 || Cain (7–8) || Takahashi (7–4) || Wilson (25) || 42,599 || 50–41
|-  style="text-align:center; background:#fbb;"
| 92 || July 18 || Mets || 4–3 (10) || Rodríguez (3–2) || Wilson (2–1) || || 37,326 || 50–42
|-  style="text-align:center; background:#bfb;"
| 93 || July 19 || @ Dodgers || 5–2 || Bumgarner (3–2) || McDonald (0–1) || Wilson (26) || 45,056 || 51–42
|-  style="text-align:center; background:#bfb;"
| 94 || July 20 || @ Dodgers || 7–5 || Casilla (3–2) || Broxton (3–2) || Affeldt (3) || 53,381 || 52–42
|-  style="text-align:center; background:#fbb;"
| 95 || July 21 || @ Dodgers || 2–0 || Billingsley (8–5) || Zito (8–5) || || 45,151 || 52–43
|-  style="text-align:center; background:#bfb;"
| 96 || July 22 || @ Diamondbacks || 3–0 || Cain (8–8) || López (5–9) || Wilson (27) || 17,230 || 53–43
|-  style="text-align:center; background:#bfb;"
| 97 || July 23 || @ Diamondbacks || 7–4 || Ray (3–0) || Jackson (6–9) || Wilson (28) || 22,512 ||54–43
|-  style="text-align:center; background:#bfb;"
| 98 || July 24 || @ Diamondbacks || 10–4 || Bumgarner (4–2) || Kennedy (5–8) || || 32,774 || 55–43
|-  style="text-align:center; background:#bfb;"
| 99 || July 25 || @ Diamondbacks || 3–2 (10) || Romo (3–3) || Vásquez (1–3) || Wilson (29) || 31,278 || 56–43
|-  style="text-align:center; background:#fbb;"
| 100 || July 26 || Marlins || 4–3 || Nolasco (11–7) || Zito (8–6) || Núñez (24) || 37,677 || 56–44
|-  style="text-align:center; background:#bfb;"
| 101 || July 27 || Marlins || 6–4 || Romo (4–3) || Sanches (0–2) || Wilson (30) || 38,904 || 57–43
|-  style="text-align:center; background:#bfb;"
| 102 || July 28 || Marlins || 10–9 (10) || Ray (4–0) || Hensley (1–4) || || 35,945 || 58–43
|-  style="text-align:center; background:#fbb;"
| 103 || July 29 || Marlins || 5–0 || Sánchez (8–6) || Bumgarner (4–3) || || 41,152 || 58–45
|-  style="text-align:center; background:#bfb;"
| 104 || July 30 || Dodgers || 6–5 || Lincecum (11–4) || Monasterios (3–3) || Ray (2) || 42,847 || 59–45
|-  style="text-align:center; background:#bfb;"
| 105 || July 31 || Dodgers || 2–1 || Mota (1–3) || Broxton (3–3) || || 42,882 || 60–45
|-

|-  style="text-align:center; background:#bfb;"
| 106 || August 1 || Dodgers || 2–0 || Cain (9–8) || Kershaw (10–6) || Wilson (31) || 42,922 || 61–45
|-  style="text-align:center; background:#bfb;"
| 107 || August 3 || @ Rockies || 10–0 || Sánchez (8–6) || Cook (4–8) || || 43,549 || 62–45
|-  style="text-align:center; background:#fbb;"
| 108 || August 4 || @ Rockies || 6–1 || Jiménez (17–2) || Bumgarner (4–4) || || 37,278 || 62–46
|-  style="text-align:center; background:#fbb;"
| 109 || August 5 || @ Braves || 3–2 || Jurrjens (4–4) || Lincecum (11–5) || Wagner (26) || 24,538 || 62–47
|-  style="text-align:center; background:#bfb;"
| 110 || August 6 || @ Braves || 3–2 (11) || López (3–2) || Moylan (3–2) || Wilson (32) || 42,178 || 63–47
|-  style="text-align:center; background:#fbb;"
| 111 || August 7 || @ Braves || 3–0 || Hudson (13–5) || Cain (9–9) || Wagner (27) || 47,305 || 63–48
|-  style="text-align:center; background:#fbb;"
| 112 || August 8 || @ Braves || 6–3 || Lowe (11–9) || Sánchez (8–7) || Saito (1) || 33,865 || 63–49
|-  style="text-align:center; background:#bfb;"
| 113 || August 9 || Cubs || 4–3 (11) || Ray (5–0) || Mateo (0–1) || || 41,943 || 64–49
|-  style="text-align:center; background:#fbb;"
| 114 || August 10 || Cubs || 8–6 || Dempster (10–8) || Lincecum (11–6) || || 35,389 || 64–50
|-  style="text-align:center; background:#bfb;"
| 115 || August 11 || Cubs || 5–4 || Romo (5–3) || Berg (0–1) || Wilson (33) || 36,139 || 65–50
|-  style="text-align:center; background:#bfb;"
| 116 || August 12 || Cubs || 8–7 || Wilson (3–1) || Cashner (1–5) || || 40,872 || 66–50
|-  style="text-align:center; background:#fbb;"
| 117 || August 13 || Padres || 3–2 || Richard (10–5) || Sánchez (8–8) || Bell (35) || 42,722 || 66–51
|-  style="text-align:center; background:#bfb;"
| 118 || August 14 || Padres || 3–2 (11) || Casilla (4–2) || Stauffer (3–2) || || 42,293 || 67–51
|-  style="text-align:center; background:#fbb;"
| 119 || August 15 || Padres || 8–2 || LeBlanc (7–10) || Lincecum (11–7)  || || 42,834 || 67–52
|-  style="text-align:center; background:#fbb;"
| 120 || August 17 || @ Phillies || 9–3 || Oswalt (8–13) || Zito (8–7) || || 45,401 || 67–53
|-  style="text-align:center; background:#fbb;"
| 121 || August 18 || @ Phillies || 8–2 || Blanton (5–6) || Cain (9–10) || || 44,410 || 67–54
|-  style="text-align:center; background:#bfb;"
| 122 || August 19 || @ Phillies || 5–2 || Sánchez (9–8) || Hamels (7–10) || Wilson (34) || 45,449 || 68–54
|-  style="text-align:center; background:#bfb;"
| 123 || August 20 || @ Cardinals || 6–3 || Bumgarner (5–4) || Westbrook (7–8) || Wilson (35) || 43,822 || 69–54
|-  style="text-align:center; background:#fbb;"
| 124 || August 21 || @ Cardinals || 5–1 || Carpenter (14–4) || Lincecum (11–8) || || 44,477 || 69–55
|-  style="text-align:center; background:#fbb;"
| 125 || August 22 || @ Cardinals || 9–0 || García (11–6) || Zito (8–8) || || 42,638 || 69–56
|-  style="text-align:center; background:#bfb;"
| 126 || August 23 || Reds || 11–2 || Cain (10–10) || Volquez (3–2) || || 32,698 || 70–56
|-  style="text-align:center; background:#bfb;"
| 127 || August 24 || Reds || 16–5 || Casilla (5–2) || Wood (4–2) || || 36,104 || 71–56
|-  style="text-align:center; background:#fbb;"
| 128 || August 25 || Reds || 12–11 (12) || Cordero (4–4) || Bumgarner (8–9) || || 36,310 || 71–57
|-  style="text-align:center; background:#fbb;"
| 129 || August 27 || Diamondbacks || 6–0 || Enright (5–2) || Lincecum (11–9) || || 38,013 || 71–58
|-  style="text-align:center; background:#fbb;"
| 130 || August 28 || Diamondbacks || 11–3 || Hudson (5–2) || Zito (8–10) || || 41,250 || 71–59
|-  style="text-align:center; background:#bfb;"
| 131 || August 29 || Diamondbacks || 9–7 || Cain (10–10) || Vásquez (1–5) || Wilson (36) || 38,735 || 72–59
|-  style="text-align:center; background:#fbb;"
| 132 || August 30 || Rockies || 2–1 || Betancourt (5–1) || Wilson (3–2) || Street (13) || 30,224 || 72–60
|-  style="text-align:center; background:#bfb;"
| 133 || August 31 || Rockies || 5–2 || Affeldt (4–3) || Belisle (6–5) || Wilson (37) || 31,099 || 73–60
|-

|-  style="text-align:center; background:#bfb;"
| 134 || September 1 || Rockies || 2–1 || Lincecum (12–9) || Jiménez (17–6) || Wilson (38) || 31,186 || 74–60
|-  style="text-align:center; background:#fbb;"
| 135 || September 3 || @ Dodgers || 4–2 || Billingsley (11–8) || Zito (8–11) || Kuo (8) || 43,046 || 74–61
|-  style="text-align:center; background:#bfb;"
| 136 || September 4 || @ Dodgers || 5–4 || López (4–2) || Broxton (5–5) || Wilson (39) || 48,220 || 75–61
|-  style="text-align:center; background:#bfb;"
| 137 || September 5 || @ Dodgers || 3–0 || Sánchez (10–8) || Kuroda (10–12) || Wilson (40) || 43,758 || 76–61
|-  style="text-align:center; background:#bfb;"
| 138 || September 6 || @ Diamondbacks || 2–0 (11) || Casilla (6–2) || Heilman (5–7) || Wilson (41) || 31,879 || 77–61
|-  style="text-align:center; background:#bfb;"
| 139 || September 7 || @ Diamondbacks || 6–3 || Lincecum (13–9) || Enright (6–3) || Affeldt (4) || 19,417 || 78–61
|-  style="text-align:center; background:#fbb;"
| 140 || September 8 || @ Diamondbacks || 3–1 || Hudson (6–2) || Zito (8–12) || Gutiérrez (8) || 19,972 || 78–62
|-  style="text-align:center; background:#bfb;"
| 141 || September 9 || @ Padres || 7–3 || Cain (11–10) || Garland (13–11) || || 28,456 || 79–62
|-  style="text-align:center; background:#bfb;"
| 142 || September 10 || @ Padres || 1–0 || Casilla (7–2) || Richard (12–7) || Wilson (42) || 33,662 || 80–62
|-  style="text-align:center; background:#fbb;"
| 143 || September 11 || @ Padres || 1–0 || Stauffer (4–3) || Bumgarner (5–5) || Bell (40) || 41,123 || 80–63
|-  style="text-align:center; background:#bfb;"
| 144 || September 12 || @ Padres || 6–1 || Lincecum (14–9) || Latos (14–6) || || 33,876 || 81–63
|-  style="text-align:center; background:#fbb;"
| 145 || September 14 || Dodgers || 1–0 || Kershaw (12–10) || Zito (8–13) || || 36,076 || 81–64
|-  style="text-align:center; background:#bfb;"
| 146 || September 15 || Dodgers || 2–1 || Cain (12–10) || Billingsley (11–10) || Wilson (43) || 34,685 || 82–64
|-  style="text-align:center; background:#bfb;"
| 147 || September 16 || Dodgers || 10–2 || Sánchez (11–8) || Lilly (8–11) || || 38,434 || 83–64
|-  style="text-align:center; background:#fbb;"
| 148 || September 17 || Brewers || 3–0 || Wolf (12–11) || Bumgarner (5–6) || || 41,835 || 83–65
|-  style="text-align:center; background:#fbb;"
| 149 || September 18 || Brewers || 2–1 || Gallardo (13–7) || Lincecum (14–10) || Axford (22) || 41,767 || 83–66
|-  style="text-align:center; background:#bfb;"
| 150 || September 19 || Brewers || 9–2 || Zito (9–13) || Narveson (11–8) || || 41,113 || 84–66
|-  style="text-align:center; background:#bfb;"
| 151 || September 21 || @ Cubs || 1–0 || Ramírez (1–3) || Cashner (2–6) || Wilson (44) || 36,364 || 85–66
|-  style="text-align:center; background:#fbb;"
| 152 || September 22 || @ Cubs || 2–0 || Wells (8–13) || Sánchez (11–9) || Mármol (34) || 37,285 || 85–67
|-  style="text-align:center; background:#bfb;"
| 153 || September 23 || @ Cubs || 13–0 || Bumgarner (6–6) || Dempster (14–11) || || 34,481 || 86–67
|-  style="text-align:center; background:#bfb;"
| 154 || September 24 || @ Rockies || 2–1 || Lincecum (15–10) || Chacín (9–10) || Wilson (45) || 49,071 || 87–67
|-  style="text-align:center; background:#fbb;"
| 155 || September 25 || @ Rockies || 10–9 (10) || Street (4–4) || Wilson (3–3) || || 43,402 || 87–68
|-  style="text-align:center; background:#bfb;"
| 156 || September 26 || @ Rockies || 4–2 || Cain (13–10) || de la Rosa (8–6) || || 32,594 || 88–68
|-  style="text-align:center; background:#bfb;"
| 157 || September 28 || Diamondbacks || 4–2 || Sánchez (12–9) || López (7–15) || Wilson (46) || 37,449 || 89–68
|-  style="text-align:center; background:#bfb;"
| 158 || September 29 || Diamondbacks || 3–1 || Lincecum (16–10) || Kennedy (9–10) || Wilson (47) || 38,228 || 90–68
|-  style="text-align:center; background:#bfb;"
| 159 || September 30 || Diamondbacks || 4–1 || Bumgarner (7–6) || Enright (6–7) || Ramírez (3) || 37,261 || 91–68
|-

|-  style="text-align:center; background:#fbb;"
| 160 || October 1 || Padres || 6–4 || Richard (14–9) || Cain (13–11) || Bell (46) || 42,409 || 91–69
|-  style="text-align:center; background:#fbb;"
| 161 || October 2 || Padres || 4–2 || Stauffer (6–5) || Zito (9–14) || Bell (47) || 42,653 || 91–70
|-  style="text-align:center; background:#bfb;"
| 162 || October 3 || Padres || 3–0 || Sánchez (13–9) || Latos (14–10) || Wilson (48) || 42,822 || 92–70
|-

Postseason

|-  style="text-align:center; background:#bfb;"
| 1 || October 7 || Braves || 1–0 || Lincecum (1–0) || Lowe (0–1) || || 43,936 || 1–0
|-  style="text-align:center; background:#fbb;"
| 2 || October 8 || Braves || 5–4 (11) || Farnsworth (1–0) || Ramírez (0–1) || || 44,046 || 1–1
|-  style="text-align:center; background:#bfb;"
| 3 || October 10 || @ Braves || 3–2 || Romo (1–0) || Kimbrel (0–1) || Wilson (1)  || 53,284 || 2–1
|-  style="text-align:center; background:#bfb;"
| 4 || October 11 || @ Braves || 3–2  || Bumgarner (1–0) || Lowe (0–2) || Wilson (2) || 44,532 || 3–1
|-

|-  style="text-align:center; background:#bfb;"
| 1 || October 16 || @ Phillies || 4–3 || Lincecum (1–0) || Halladay (0–1) || Wilson (1) || 45,929 || 1–0
|-  style="text-align:center; background:#fbb;"
| 2 || October 17 || @ Phillies || 6–1 || Oswalt (1–0) || Sánchez (0–1) || || 46,099 || 1–1
|-  style="text-align:center; background:#bfb;"
| 3 || October 19 || Phillies || 3–0 || Cain (1–0) || Hamels (0–1) || Wilson (2) || 43,320 || 2–1
|-  style="text-align:center; background:#bfb;"
| 4 || October 20 || Phillies || 6–5 || Wilson (1–0) || Oswalt (1–1) || || 43,515 || 3–1
|-  style="text-align:center; background:#fbb;"
| 5 || October 21 || Phillies || 4–2 || Halladay (1–1) || Lincecum (1–1) || Lidge (1) || 43,713 || 3–2
|-  style="text-align:center; background:#bfb;"
| 6 || October 23 || @ Phillies || 3–2 || López (1–0) || Madson (0–1) || Wilson (3) || 46,062 || 4–2
|-

|-  style="text-align:center; background:#bfb;"
| 1 || October 27 || Rangers || 11–7 || Lincecum (1–0) || Lee (0–1) || || 43,601 || 1–0
|-  style="text-align:center; background:#bfb;"
| 2 || October 28 || Rangers || 9–0 || Cain (1–0) || Wilson (0–1) || || 43,622 || 2–0
|-  style="text-align:center; background:#fbb;"
| 3 || October 30 || @ Rangers || 4–2 || Lewis (1–0) || Sánchez (0–1) || Feliz (1) || 52,419 || 2–1
|-  style="text-align:center; background:#bfb;"
| 4 || October 31 || @ Rangers || 4–0 || Bumgarner (1–0) || Hunter (0–1) || || 51,920 || 3–1
|-  style="text-align:center; background:#bfb;"
| 5 || November 1 || @ Rangers || 3–1 || Lincecum (2–0) || Lee (0–2) || Wilson (1) || 52,045 || 4–1
|-

Roster

Season Summary-Regular Season

April

The Giants opened the season with a 5–2 win over the Houston Astros and won their first four games, including a thrilling 5–4 win over the Atlanta Braves in 13 innings in their home opener at AT&T Park. But they failed to put together a winning streak longer than 2 games for the rest of the month, losing four straight games between the 18th and 21st, though strong pitching often kept them in games despite an inconsistent offense. After a tough 7–6 loss to the Phillies in 11 innings on the 28th, the Giants rebounded for a 5–2 win over the Colorado Rockies to close out the month.

May
After taking two out of three from the Rockies, the Giants traveled to Florida to start a three-game series with the Marlins. They led the first game 5–3 behind Tim Lincecum's 13 strikeouts, but fell behind 6–5 in the eighth. Down to their last out, Aaron Rowand hit a home run to tie the game. The Giants won 9–6 in 12 innings and went on to sweep the series.

The team then went through a rough stretch, losing two out of three to the Mets before getting swept by the NL West leading San Diego Padres. They recovered a bit by sweeping the Astros, and splitting a two-game series with the Padres but then went on a five-game losing streak before snapping it with a win over the Washington Nationals. On May 29, Buster Posey was called up to the Giants and had three hits and three runs batted in during a 12–1 win over the Arizona Diamondbacks. That same day, the team signed Bay Area native Pat Burrell to a minor league contract. Padres CEO Jeff Moorad, Burrell's friend and his former agent, would later say he regretted not recruiting Burrell to the Padres. Originally signed as a bench player, Burrell played his way into the starting lineup and wound up hitting .266 with 18 home runs and 51 runs batted in over 96 games. The team would end May with a flourish, winning 5 of their last 7 games.

June
The Giants continued their strong play into the month of June.  Though they lost the first series of the month to the Rockies, they won 3 out of their next 4 series, including completing a sweep of the Oakland Athletics, who had swept them the previous month.  In the second half of the month, the team collapsed, losing their next 5 series in a row and ended the month with a 5-game losing streak culminating in a three-game sweep by the rival Dodgers. On June 30, the Giants traded Bengie Molina to the Texas Rangers, clearing the way for Buster Posey to become the everyday catcher.

July
The month of July marked a very strong comeback for the team, although it did not start off well.  The Giants started the month with a 4-game series against the Rockies and lost the first two, extending their losing streak to 7.  After coming back to win the third game despite losing a six-run lead early on, the Giants suffered an arduous 15-inning defeat to Colorado in the fourth game on July 4, putting their record at 41–40.  The Giants immediately bounced back and went on a surge, coming back to sweep a 4-game series against the Brewers.  They went on to win six of the next seven series during the month, including a sweep against the Diamondbacks, with the only blemish being a 4-game split with the Marlins, the most noteworthy of the four being a game in which the Giants led 9–2 at one point only to see the Marlins battle back to tie it. The game was won by the Giants in the bottom of the 10th inning when Andrés Torres hit a game-winning single for his fourth hit of the game, making the final score 10–9. On July 20, the Giants beat the Dodgers 7–5 at Dodger Stadium after trailing 5–1 at one point. On July 31, Burrell hit a 2-run home run in the eighth inning to lead the Giants to another comeback win over the Dodgers. Overall, the team went 20–8 during the month, finishing July with a 60–45 record. Pitchers Tim Lincecum and Brian Wilson were selected for the All-Star Game.

August
After their strong July, the Giants stumbled throughout August.  Ace starting pitcher Tim Lincecum, who started the month with an 11–4 record and a 3.15 ERA, lost his edge, going 0–5 with a 7.82 ERA over the month. The Giants lost series against the Braves, Cardinals, Phillies, and Diamondbacks, though they took three out of four from the Chicago Cubs early in the month. After scoring blowout wins in the first two games of a three-game series against the Cincinnati Reds, the Giants trailed 10–1 in the third game but scored six runs in the eighth and ended up taking an 11–10 lead. But the Reds came back to tie it in the top of the 9th after Drew Stubbs reached 2nd base on a throwing error by Pablo Sandoval, and Brian Wilson gave up a game-tying single to Paul Janish.  Then in the top of the 12th inning, Barry Zito, in a rare relief appearance, gave up the go-ahead hit to Joey Votto.  Though the Giants got the tying run to third base on singles by Sandoval and Mike Fontenot in the bottom of the inning, they did not score and lost the game 12–11. The Giants then lost three of their next five games, ending the month 13–15 overall, as the calendar turned to September. The Padres, however, would go on a 10-game losing streak starting on August 26. Three days prior to the start of the Padres losing streak, the Giants acquired Cody Ross off waivers from the Florida Marlins to block him going to the Padres. Ross didn't do much offensively for the rest of the regular season but would become a major factor in the postseason.

September
On September 10, the Giants defeated the Padres to tie for first place in the NL West after trailing the Padres by 7 and a half games on July 4. For the next 15 days, each team traded the top spot. Then the Giants began a four-game winning streak to take over first place, taking the lead for good on September 26. Their lead would grow to three games entering the final three games of the season against the Padres as the Giants won 18 of the 26 games they played during the month. Lincecum also rebounded from his poor August, posting a record of 5–1 and striking out fifty two while walking only six.

The Giants pitching staff posted historic numbers for the month of September, going a record 18 straight games giving up 3 runs or less. (The last team to accomplish that feat was the 1917 Chicago White Sox.) Their 1.78 team ERA was the lowest in a month since divisional play started in 1969.

October

The Giants entered the three game series with the Padres needing just one win to clinch the NL West. They lost the first two games by scores of 6–4 and 4–2 before clinching the NL West with a 3–0 win on the final day of the regular season, finishing with a 92–70 record. It was the Giants' first NL West division title since 2003. Because the Atlanta Braves also defeated the Phillies that day, they clinched the NL Wild Card, eliminating the Padres from contention. The Giants would face the Braves in the NLDS starting October 7.

Postseason

National League Division Series

The NLDS was a close, hard-fought series. Tim Lincecum tossed a complete game two-hit shutout and struck out a franchise postseason record 14 in the opener as the Giants won 1–0. In game two, the Giants took a 4–0 lead behind Matt Cain's stellar pitching and Pat ("The Bat") Burrell's first inning three-run homer. But the Braves fought back, tying the score with three runs in the eighth, then winning in the 11th inning 5–4 on Rick Ankiel's home run as the series shifted to Atlanta.

In game three Jonathan Sánchez struck out 11 and carried a no-hitter into the sixth inning. The Giants led 1–0 in the eighth until Eric Hinske's pinch-hit two-run homer gave the Braves the lead. Rookie righthander Craig Kimbrel came out of the bullpen to start the top of the ninth for the Braves, relieving Jonny Venters who had struck out the side the previous inning. Kimbrel retired Cody Ross on a popout to Brooks Conrad for the first out. Travis Ishikawa pinch-hit for reliever Sergio Romo and drew a walk. After striking out leadoff man Andrés Torres, Kimbrel gave up a two-strike single to second baseman Freddy Sanchez and was lifted, leaving runners on first and second with two outs. Another rookie Brave, lefty Michael Dunn, came on and gave up a two-strike, game-tying single to Aubrey Huff. Right-hander Peter Moylan relieved Dunn and induced a grounder from Buster Posey which bounced through Conrad's legs, the second baseman's third error of the game. Sanchez scored on the play, giving the Giants a 3–2 lead. Kyle Farnsworth came on and got the third out, but the damage was done. The Giants brought in their closer Brian Wilson for the bottom of the ninth. He held the lead, giving up a single to Brian McCann but retiring Nate McLouth on a grounder to end the game and earn a clutch save.

With their backs against the wall, the Braves sent Derek Lowe to the mound on three days' rest. They scored first in the bottom of the third when Brian McCann's sacrifice fly drove in Omar Infante.

Lowe took a no-hitter into the sixth inning, but the Giants tied the game with one out on Cody Ross' first-pitch homer off a Lowe cutter. Brian McCann answered with another in the bottom of the inning off Giants' rookie starter Madison ("Mad Bum") Bumgarner to take back the lead.
After Lowe walked Aubrey Huff and allowed an infield single to Buster Posey with one out in the seventh, Bobby Cox, managing his last game after a long and distinguished career in Toronto and Atlanta, went to the mound apparently to remove Lowe from the game. But after talking to him, Cox elected to leave Lowe in, prompting huge cheers from the Atlanta fans.

The next batter, Pat Burrell, walked on a 3–1 pitch near the inside corner, and Lowe's night was done after striking out eight while allowing only two hits and walking two. Relievers Peter Moylan and Jonny Venters couldn't hold the lead, as the Giants promptly scored two runs on Juan Uribe's RBI fielder's choice and Cody Ross' RBI single. The Braves might have been able to escape the one-out, bases-loaded jam unscathed and still ahead 2–1 if not for shortstop Álex González's bases-loading throwing error, his second in the game. Both errors were debatable. The first was a ball hit in the hole he didn't field cleanly with the speedy Andrés Torres running, earlier in the game. The second call was more controversial. With two on and one out and fielding a weakly hit groundball, González elected to throw to second but threw high to second baseman Omar Infante, who was ruled to have come off the base jumping for the throw.

Left-handed Giants reliever Javier López entered the game with two outs in the eighth and pinch-runner Nate McLouth the potential tying run at second base, and struck out slugging rookie sensation Jason Heyward. In the bottom of the ninth, the Braves had one last chance to rally. With one out, Giants closer Brian Wilson walked Rick Ankiel and Eric Hinske to put the potential tying and winning runs on base. But Omar Infante struck out swinging and Melky Cabrera grounded out to end the game and the series in Cox's final game as a manager, both teams giving him a standing ovation after the final out, which was almost not made: slick-fielding Travis Ishikawa had to stretch up and out as far as he could while just managing to keep his toe on the bag as he snow-coned the high, wide throw from third near the tip of the pocket of his first baseman's mitt.

National League Championship Series

The Giants then advanced to the NLCS to face the heavily favored Philadelphia Phillies, who were looking for their third straight pennant. Behind two home runs by NLCS MVP Cody Ross and a strong start from Tim Lincecum, the Giants won Game 1, 4–3. The Phillies easily took Game 2 with a 6–1 win over Jonathan Sánchez before the series shifted to San Francisco for the next three games. Matt Cain and the Giants won Game 3, 3–0, for a 2–1 series lead.

A heart-stopping, crucial Game 4 saw the Giants take an early 2–0 lead. After the Phillies scored four runs in the top of the fifth, the Giants got a run back on an Aubrey Huff single up the middle in the bottom of the fifth, which scored Andrés Torres. In the sixth inning, Pat Burrell drew a leadoff walk and advanced to third on a Cody Ross double. Pablo Sandoval came to the plate and appeared to double down the right field line, but the ball hugged the line and was called foul. Four pitches later, however, Sandoval lined a two-run double sharply into the left-center field gap, scoring Burrell and Ross and giving the Giants a 5–4 lead.

The Phillies tied the score in the top of the eighth with back-to-back doubles by Ryan Howard and Jayson Werth. Giants reliever Sergio Romo recovered to retire the next three Phillies and strand Werth at second, retaining the 5–5 tie.  Giants closer Brian Wilson retired the Phillies 1-2-3 in the top of the ninth.

In the bottom of the ninth, Game 2 winner Roy Oswalt volunteered for a rare relief appearance. With one out Huff singled past a diving Howard. Posey followed with a single to right —- his fourth hit of the game -— that enabled Huff to reach third. Juan Uribe, batting for Wilson, followed with a sacrifice fly to deep left field that scored Huff with the winning run. The victory gave the Giants a commanding 3–1 series lead.

With a chance to wrap up the NL pennant at home, Lincecum got the start in game 5. Although the Giants scored first, Philadelphia took a 4–2 win, aided by a series of Giants defensive miscues that allowed the Phillies to score three runs in the third inning, to send the series back to Philadelphia.

Game 6 saw Giant starter Jonathan Sánchez give up two early runs, but San Francisco rallied against Phillies starter Roy Oswalt in the third inning. Sánchez led off with a single, and took second when leadoff man Andrés Torres' long fly to the wall in center was dropped by Shane Victorino. Freddy Sanchez sacrificed the runners to second and third, and Aubrey Huff hit a single up the middle, which scored Sánchez before Victorino nailed Torres at home. But Huff took second base on the throw home and eventually scored on second baseman Plácido Polanco's throwing error to tie it up at 2–2. In the bottom of the inning, Sánchez lost his control by yielding a leadoff walk and then hitting Chase Utley with a pitch; Sanchez then lost his poise, prompting both benches to empty and glare at one another before order was restored.  Replacing Sanchez, Lefty Jeremy Affeldt escaped the jam and retired six in a row.  Manager Bruce Bochy then called on starter Madison Bumgarner, who survived two rocky innings without allowing a run, and Javier López, who retired the side in order in the seventh.  With two outs in the top of the eighth, Juan Uribe hit an opposite field drive just over the right field barrier for a solo home run to give the Giants their first lead at 3–2.

Starter Tim Lincecum, who had pitched 7 innings two days earlier, then entered the game in a relief role.  He struck out Werth after falling behind 2–0, but then yielded back-to-back singles to Victorino and Raúl Ibáñez, prompting Bochy to bring in closer Brian Wilson. First baseman Huff then atoned for a critical Game 5 error by gloving a sharp line drive from Carlos Ruiz and easily doubling off Victorino at second to end the inning.

In the bottom of the ninth Wilson got pinch-hitter Ross Gload to ground out, but then walked leadoff man Jimmy Rollins. Plácido Polanco grounded to Uribe, who forced Rollins at second. Utley then drew a walk, moving the potential tying run to second and putting the potential winning run on first. With a full count and the runners moving on the pitch, Wilson froze slugger Ryan Howard with a called third strike on a cutter that just caught the bottom of the strike zone to send the Giants on to the World Series.

World Series

The 2010 World Series pitted the Giants against the Texas Rangers, who had just won their first pennant. Game 1, in San Francisco because the National League had won the All-Star Game, saw Lincecum face lefty Cliff Lee, who had had a stellar first postseason for the Phillies the year before. Texas took a 1–0 lead in the first, but Lincecum induced a double play to limit the damage. Lee wasn't sharp, though, and gave up seven runs, one of them unearned because Rangers manager Ron Washington had gambled on putting veteran slugging designated hitter Vladimir Guerrero ("Bad Vlad") in AT&T Park's super-spacious right field which he simply could not cover and misplayed more than one would-be single into extra bases. Uribe hit a three-run home run in the sixth to extend a 5–2 lead to 8–2. Entering the ninth, the Giants were up 11–4 before the Rangers scored three essentially meaningless runs to make the final score 11–7.

Game 2 was a pitcher's duel between Matt Cain and lefty C. J. Wilson. The game was scoreless until the bottom of the fifth, when Édgar Rentería hit a solo home run. Cain went 7 2⁄3 innings, allowing only four hits. Uríbe singled in another run in the seventh to extend the lead to 2–0, but in the eighth things fell apart for the Rangers as their bullpen imploded and the Giants scored seven runs. The Giants won Game 2, 9–0.

The series shifted to Texas for the next (which proved to be the last) three games. Behind a solo home run by superstar slugger Josh Hamilton and an earlier three-run blast by rookie first baseman Mitch Moreland in support of a strong start by Colby Lewis, the Rangers defeated Jonathan Sánchez in Game 3, 4–2. Game 4 was played on a hot, sultry Halloween night. Designated hitter Huff in the third (with a man on) and catcher Posey in the eighth hit home runs, while Bumgarner pitched eight shutout innings as the Giants won 4–0, Wilson finishing up in a non-save situation.

Game 5 was a pitching rematch of Game 1 between former Cy Young Award winners Cliff Lee and Tim Lincecum. Down 3–1 in the series, the Rangers needed a win in their ballpark to send the Series back to San Francisco or the Giants would return home as champions. What resulted was the pitching duel anticipated, but not realized, in Game 1. Both Lee and Lincecum pitched six shutout innings, with Lincecum allowing only two hits and Lee three. In the top of the seventh inning, Ross and Uríbe singled back to back to put two runners on with none out. The next hitter, Huff, who had never laid down a bunt in his major league career, sacrificed successfully, with only a quick pickup and crisp, accurate throw by Lee to just get Huff at first saved a bases-loaded, nobody out dilemma for Texas. Runners were now at second and third with one out for Burrell, whom Lee struck out after a struggle for the second out, preserving the scoreless tie for the moment. Shortstop Édgar Rentería, who had hit a walk-off single in Game 7 off Cleveland's Charles Nagy to win the 1997 World Series for Jim Leyland and his Florida Marlins in extra innings, now came to the plate. His two years with San Francisco had been considered a major disappointment, marred by injuries and slumps, but here in the World Series he became an unlikely hero by launching a three-run homer to left. After Nelson Cruz answered with a solo homer in the seventh, Lincecum shut the door on the Rangers, giving up just three hits and striking out ten in eight innings of work. Brian Wilson then retired the side in order in the ninth for the Series-winning save and first-time baseball world championships not just for the Giants (for the first time in 56 years) but for San Francisco, since the Giants' five other world championships were won in New York (in 1905, 1921, 1922, 1933 and 1954). Rentería was named World Series MVP for hitting .412 with two home runs (including the Series winner) and six RBI.  It was Bochy's first world championship as a player or manager, having played as a second-string catcher for eight years and having managed the Padres and Giants for sixteen.

The firsts with the championship were:
Giants:
Championship since , when in New York.
Championship since moving to San Francisco.
City and County of San Francisco:
World Series championship.
 Major sports championship since the 49ers won Super Bowl XXIX in 1995.
San Francisco Bay Area:
Major sports championship since the 49ers win in Super Bowl XXIX.

In summing up the firsts, Larry Baer, the president of the Giants and a fourth generation resident of San Francisco, said that the team dedicated the championship to everyone who has worn a Giants uniform, and all Giants fans since the team's move to San Francisco, honoring 53 years of baseball in the city.

Postseason

NLDS vs. Braves

NLCS vs. Phillies

2010 World Series

Regular season stats

Batting
Note: G = Games played; AB = At bats; R = Runs scored; H = Hits; 2B = Doubles; 3B = Triples; HR = Home runs; RBI = Runs batted in; AVG = Batting average; SB = Stolen bases

Pitching
Note: W = Wins; L = Losses; ERA = Earned run average; G = Games pitched; GS = Games started; SV = Saves; IP = Innings pitched; R = Runs allowed; ER = Earned runs allowed; BB = Walks allowed; K = Strikeouts

Postseason stats

Batting
Note: G = Games played; AB = At Bats; R = Runs scored; H = Hits; 2B = Doubles; 3B = Triples; HR = Home runs; RBI = Runs batted in; AVG = Batting average; SB = Stolen bases

Pitching
Note: W = Wins; L = Losses; ERA = Earned run average; G = Games pitched; GS = Games started; SV = Saves; IP = Innings pitched; R = Runs allowed; ER = Earned runs allowed; BB = Walks allowed; K = Strikeouts

Farm system

LEAGUE CHAMPIONS: San Jose

References

Further reading

External links

2010 San Francisco Giants season Official Site
2010 San Francisco Giants season at Baseball Reference

San Francisco Giants
San Francisco Giants seasons
National League West champion seasons
National League champion seasons
World Series champion seasons
San Francisco Giants
2010 in San Francisco